Cannabichromene (CBC), also called cannabichrome, cannanbichromene, pentylcannabichromene or cannabinochromene, is an anti-inflammatory which may contribute to the pain-killing effect of cannabis.
It is one of the hundreds of cannabinoids found in the Cannabis plant, and is therefore a phytocannabinoid. It bears structural similarity to the other natural cannabinoids, including tetrahydrocannabinol (THC), tetrahydrocannabivarin (THCV), cannabidiol (CBD), and cannabinol (CBN), among others. CBC and its derivatives are as abundant as cannabinols in cannabis. It is not scheduled by the Convention on Psychotropic Substances. It is more common in tropical cannabis varieties.

Biosynthesis 
Within the Cannabis plant, CBC occurs mainly as cannabichromenic acid (CBCA, 2-COOH-CBC, CBC-COOH). Geranyl pyrophosphate and olivetolic acid combine to produce cannabigerolic acid (CBGA; the sole intermediate for all other phytocannabinoids), which is cyclized by the enzyme CBCA synthase to form CBCA. Over time, or when heated above 93 °C, CBCA is decarboxylated, producing CBC. See also the biosynthetic scheme image below.

Pharmacology
Cannabichromene may affect the psychoactivity of THC. CBC acts on the TRPV1 and TRPA1 receptors, interfering with their ability to break down endocannabinoids (chemicals such as anandamide and 2-AG that the body creates naturally). CBC has shown antitumor effects in breast cancer xenoplants in mice. It also has anticonvulsant activity in a mouse model.

In vitro, CBC shows affinity to CB1 and CB2 with a binding affinity of 713 nM at CB1 and 256 nM at CB2 which is significantly less than THC with 35 nM at CB1 in the same study. acting as an agonist for cAMP stimulation and an antagonist at beta-arrestin. Additionally, CBC is an agonist of TRPA1, and less potently TRPV3 and TRPV4. CBC has two stereoisomers.

References 

Anti-inflammatory agents
Phytocannabinoids
Benzopyrans
Phenols